Jayden Ugonna Elias Mbaeri Bennetts (born 26 June 2001) is an English professional footballer who plays as a midfielder for Phönix Lübeck.

Career
Bennetts came through the academy system at Watford and signed a one-year professional contract at the conclusion of his scholarship in May 2019.

On 23 January 2020, Bennetts made his debut for Watford in a 2–1 FA Cup third round replay defeat away at Tranmere Rovers, coming on as an extra-time substitute for Joseph Hungbo. He left the club in June 2020.

In November 2020, Bennetts joined the reserve team of Paderborn until the end of the season.

On 12 August 2021, he moved to VfB Stuttgart II. He was released by the club in May 2022.

In September 2022, Bennetts joined Regionalliga Nord side Phönix Lübeck.

Personal life
Bennetts was born in England to a Nigerian father and German mother. Bennetts' older brother Keanan is also a professional footballer.

Career statistics

Club

Notes

References

2001 births
Living people
Footballers from the London Borough of Barnet
English footballers
English people of Nigerian descent
English people of German descent
Association football midfielders
Watford F.C. players
VfB Stuttgart II players
1. FC Phönix Lübeck players
Regionalliga players
English expatriate footballers
Expatriate footballers in Germany
English expatriate sportspeople in Germany